Clive Woods (born 18 December 1947) is a former professional footballer who has played for both Ipswich Town and derby rivals Norwich City.

Honours
Ipswich Town
 FA Cup: 1978
 Texaco Cup: 1973

Individual
Ipswich Town Hall of Fame: Inducted 2014

References

1947 births
Living people
Ipswich Town F.C. players
Norwich City F.C. players
Association football midfielders
Association football forwards
Gothic F.C. players
English Football League players
English footballers
FA Cup Final players